Brachmia radiosella is a moth in the family Gelechiidae. It was described by Nikolay Grigoryevich Erschoff in 1874. It is found in Turkestan.

References

Moths described in 1874
Brachmia
Moths of Asia